Richard Daryl "Ric" Brown (born June 1, 1946) is an American economist who served from 2008-2018 as the Virginia Secretary of Finance. He joined the Virginia Department of Planning and Budget in 1971 and was appointed as its director by Governor Jim Gilmore in 2001. He was reappointed in 2002 and 2006 and, in 2008, was made Secretary of Finance following Jody Wagner's departure to run for Lieutenant Governor of Virginia.

Born in Arlington, Virginia, Brown graduated in 1968 from the College of William & Mary, earning a B.A. in economics and received a Master of Commerce degree from the University of Richmond.

References

External links
Virginia Secretary of Finance
 Virginia Department of Planning and Budget

1946 births
Living people
State cabinet secretaries of Virginia
College of William & Mary alumni
University of Richmond alumni
People from Arlington County, Virginia